David Assur Assing (12 December 1787, Königsberg – 25 April 1842, Hamburg) was a Prussian physician and poet.

Biography
Assing studied at the universities of Tübingen, Halle, Vienna, and Göttingen. He received his doctorate from the University of Göttingen in August 1807, his thesis being Materiæ Alimentariæ Lineamenta ad Leges Chemico-Dynamicas Adumbrata. This was published at Göttingen in 1809. Three years later he went to Hamburg with the intention of settling there as a practising physician; but hardly a year passed before the war occurred for the liberation of Germany from Napoleonic rule, and he entered the army, joining a regiment of cavalry in the capacity of physician. He served first in the Russian, then in the Prussian, army.

In 1815 he returned to Hamburg, and the following year married Rosa Maria Varnhagen, the daughter of a physician of that city. Assing converted to Christianity upon marriage, and changed his surname to Assing. He was known as a student of Greek medicine, making a special study of Hippocrates. He also contributed lyric poems to the Musenalmanach, published by his friends Kerner and Chamisso; to the Tübinger Morgenblatt; and in Isidorus Hesperiden. After the death of his wife on 22 June 1840, he published "Rosa Maria's Poetischer Nachlass" (Altona, 1841). The last years of his life were passed in solitude.

References
 

1787 births
1842 deaths
German people of Jewish descent
Converts to Lutheranism from Judaism
19th-century German poets
19th-century German male writers
19th-century German writers
Jewish physicians
19th-century German physicians
19th-century Lutherans
German male poets